Dalton Hall might refer to:

Places
 Dalton Hall, Cumbria, England
 Dalton Hall, East Riding of Yorkshire, Dalton Holme, England
 Dalton-Ellis Hall, residence hall at the University of Manchester, Greater Manchester, England, formerly known as Dalton Hall

People
 H. Dalton Hall (1881–1946), South Australian marine artist